National Route 447 is a national highway of Japan connecting Ebino, Miyazaki and Izumi, Kagoshima in Japan, with a total length of 60.4 km (37.5 mi).

References

National highways in Japan
Roads in Kagoshima Prefecture
Roads in Miyazaki Prefecture